"Dear Heart" is a song written by Henry Mancini, Ray Evans, and Jay Livingston and performed by Andy Williams.   It appears on the 1965 Andy Williams album, Andy Williams' Dear Heart.
The song was the theme to the 1964 movie Dear Heart.  It was nominated for the Academy Award for Best Original Song and also nominated for best song at the 22nd Golden Globe Awards.

Chart performance
The song reached #2 on the U.S. adult contemporary chart and #24 on the Billboard chart in 1964.

Recordings
Henry Mancini released a version of the song in 1964 that reached #14 on the adult contemporary chart and #77 on the Billboard Hot 100.
Frank Sinatra recorded the song for his 1964 album Softly, as I Leave You.
Jack Jones also released a version in 1964, reaching #6 on the adult contemporary chart and #30 on the Billboard Hot 100.
Al Martino - for his album We Could (1965).
Bobby Darin - included in his album Venice Blue (1965)
Brenda Lee - in her album The Versatile Brenda Lee (1965).
Bobby Vinton - on his LP Drive-In Movie Time (1965).
Mrs. Miller covered the song for her first Capitol Records album  Mrs. Miller's Greatest Hits (1966).
Slim Whitman - included in his album Home on the Range (1977)
In the UK, there were cover versions in 1965 issued by Ronnie Hilton and Ronnie Carroll.

References

1964 singles
Songs with music by Henry Mancini
Songs with lyrics by Ray Evans
Songs with music by Jay Livingston
Andy Williams songs
Jack Jones (singer) songs
Columbia Records singles
Songs written for films
1964 songs